Lambertianin C is an ellagitannin.

Natural occurrence 
Lambertianin C can be found in Rubus species such as Rubus lambertianus, in cloudberries (Rubus chamaemorus) and in red raspberries (Rubus idaeus).

Chemistry 
Lambertianin C is trimer of casuarictin linked by sanguisorbic acid ester groups between glucopyranose moieties.  It contributes to the antioxidant capacity of raspberries.

References

External links 
 Lambertianin C at www.phenol-explorer.eu

Ellagitannins
Natural phenol trimers
Rubus